The 2000 San Miguel Beermen season was the 26th season of the franchise in the Philippine Basketball Association (PBA).

Draft picks

Championships
The San Miguel Beermen won their 14th PBA title in the Commissioner's Cup by defeating first-time finalist Sta.Lucia Realtors, four games to one. The Beermen overtakes the famed Crispa Redmanizers as the league's winningest ballclub.  

In the Governor's Cup, the San Miguel Beermen claim their 15th crown at the expense of Purefoods Tender Juicy Hotdogs, four games to one, as the Beermen retains the two championships they won last year.

Awards
In his third year in the league, Danny Ildefonso, who won Rookie of the Year Honors in 1998, bag the coveted Most Valuable Player (MVP) trophy. 
Two other Beermen, sophomore Danny Seigle and guard Olsen Racela made it to the Mythical five selection.

Roster

Elimination round

Games won

References

San Miguel Beermen seasons
San